Plan of Action is the third full-length album by Ska band The Kingpins on the Stomp record label. It is also the final recording the band made before its breakup in 2004. The album, the follow-up to the 1999 album Let's Go to Work released only a year before, was cited as a big change in the band's musical style. The band experimented with different stylistic fusions, mixing ska with various other musical genres, including new wave and breakbeat and had many guest vocalists singing with them. The title track was a cover of a song originally recorded by Manual Scan. Plan of Action contains The Kingpins' most popular song, a cover of L'Aventurier by Indochine.

Track listing
 Plan of Action
 Designated Driver
 L'aventurier
 Sick Valentino
 Takin' It Uptown
 Matchbox
 Bordel
 The Main
 Goes a Little Something Like This
 Consequence
 All the World's a Cage
 End of the Parade
 Supernova

References

2000 albums
The Kingpins albums